Dimaro Folgarida is a comune in Trentino in the northern Italian region Trentino-Alto Adige/Südtirol, located about  northwest of the provincial capital Trento.

Dimaro Folgarida borders the following municipalities: Cles, Commezzadura, Croviana, Malè, Pinzolo, Ville d'Anaunia.

The comune was established on 1 January 2016 after the merger of the municipalities of Dimaro and Monclassico.

References

External links
 Homepage of the city